Santa Anita may refer to:

Places
Little Santa Anita Canyon, a canyon in the San Gabriel Mountains, California
Santa Anita metro station, a station on the Mexico City Metro
Rancho Santa Anita, a 13,319-acre (53.90 km2) land grant given to Hugo Reid
Santa Anita, Baja California Sur, a village in Baja California del Sur, Mexico
Santa Anita, California, a community in Los Angeles County
Santa Anita Assembly Center, a temporary Detention Camp for Japanese Americans during World War II in Santa Anita, California
Santa Anita Canyon, a canyon in the Angeles National Forest in California
Santa Anita District, a district of the Lima Province in Peru
Santa Anita Golf Course, in Los Angeles, California
Santa Anita Park, a thoroughbred racetrack in Arcadia, California, United States
Westfield Santa Anita, a shopping mall in Arcadia, California

Horse races
Santa Anita Handicap a horse race run each March at Santa Anita Park in Arcadia, California
Santa Anita Oaks, a horse race held annually in mid March at Santa Anita Park in Arcadia, California
Santa Anita Derby, a horse race run each April at Santa Anita Park in Arcadia, California

es:Santa Anita